Casting the Runes is a supernatural television drama produced by ABC Television in 1968. Running at 50 minutes, it was first broadcast on 22 March 1968 and was based on the ghost story Casting the Runes by British writer and academic M. R. James, first published in 1911 as the fourth story in More Ghost Stories, which was James' second collection of ghost stories. The first television adaptation of the story, it was produced as an episode of the anthology series Mystery and Imagination (Season 3, episode 1, 1968) with John Fraser as Dunning and Robert Eddison as Karswell.

Synopsis
In 1905 the thin-skinned Julian Karswell (Robert Eddison) is quick to anger and seeks revenge for every perceived slight. As a demonologist he is able to summon dark unseen forces to carry out his vindictive commands. When an academic association rejects his paper "The Truth of Alchemy" he does not take the rejection well. He makes inquiries to discover who turned his paper down, and discovers it was Edward Dunning (John Fraser). Dunning earns Karswell's wrath and soon begins to experience strange and disturbing events. He is shocked and angry when he discovers a memorial to his own death, a month hence, in the window of a tram. He complains to the conductor of the tram who tries to rub off the message, but it seems to be within the glass itself. After Dunning leaves the driver (Neal Arden) and the conductor (Ronald Pember) turn to the message - but it is gone. When a disguised Karswell passes a hidden curse written in runes to Dunning he must work out a way of passing it back to the wary Karswell before their disagreement leads to terrible consequences.

Cast
Dunning .. John Fraser
Karswell .. Robert Eddison
Gayton	.. Gordon Jackson
Harrington	.. Michael Lees
Mason	.. Richard Huggett
Dr Ramsay	.. Basil Henson
Ellen	.. Julie Wallace
Vicar .. Michael Rothwell
Conductor	.. Ronald Pember
Driver	.. Neal Arden
Attendant	.. Henry Kay
Coachman .. John Barrett
Railwayman	.. Robert Hunter

Adaptation
The television drama was produced by ABC Television to a script by Evelyn Frazer and was directed by Alan Cooke. Only a short three minute excerpt is known to have survived.

References

External links

Adaptations of works by M. R. James
ITV television dramas
Television shows based on short fiction
Television shows produced by ABC Weekend TV
1968 horror films
1968 films
1968 television films
British supernatural television shows
1960s ghost films
Films about curses
British ghost films
1960s British films